This is a list of foreign ministers in 2016.

Africa
  - Ramtane Lamamra (2013–2017)
  - Georges Rebelo Chicoti (2010–2017)
  -
Saliou Akadiri (2015–2016)
Aurélien Agbénonci (2016–present)
  - Pelonomi Venson-Moitoi (2014–2018)
  - 
Moussa Nébié (2015–2016)
Alpha Barry (2016–2021)
  - Alain Aimé Nyamitwe   (2015–2018)
 - Lejeune Mbella Mbella (2015–present)
  -
Jorge Tolentino (2014–2016)
Luís Felipe Tavares (2016–2021)
  -
Samuel Rangba (2015–2016)
Charles-Armel Doubane (2016–present)
  - Moussa Faki (2008–2017)
  -
Abdoulkarim Mohamed (2015–2016)
Mohamed Bacar Dossar (2016–2017)
  - Jean-Claude Gakosso (2015–present)
  - 
 Raymond Tshibanda (2012–2016)
 Léonard She Okitundu (2016–2019)
  - Mahamoud Ali Youssouf (2005–present)
  - Sameh Shoukry (2014–present)
  - Agapito Mba Mokuy (2012–2018)
  - Osman Saleh Mohammed (2007–present)
  -
Tedros Adhanom (2012–2016)
Workneh Gebeyehu (2016–2019)
  -
 Emmanuel Issoze-Ngondet (2012–2016)
 Pacôme Moubelet-Boubeya (2016–2017)
  - Neneh MacDouall-Gaye (2015–2017)
  - Hanna Tetteh (2013–2017)
  -
 François Lonseny Fall (2012–2016)
 Makalé Camara (2016–2017)
  -
Artur Silva (2015–2016)
Soares Sambú (2016)
Jorge Malú (2016–2018)
  -
 Charles Koffi Diby (2012–2016)
 Albert Toikeusse Mabri (2016)
 Marcel Amon Tanoh (acting) (2016–2020)
  - Amina Mohamed (2013–2018)
  -
 Tlohang Sekhamane (2015–2016)
 'Mamphono Khaketla (2016–2017)
  -
 Elias Shoniyin (acting) (2015–2016)
 Marjon Kamara (2016–2018)
Libya
 Government of  House of Representatives of Libya (Government of Libya internationally recognized to 12 March 2016) - Mohammed al-Dairi (2014–2019)
 National Salvation Government of Libya, government of  New General National Congress of Libya (Government of Libya in rebellion internationally unrecognized. disbanded 5 April 2016) - Ali Rahman Abou Zekok (2015–2016)
  Government of National Accord of Libya (Interim government internationally recognized as the sole legitimate government of Libya from 12 March 2016) - Mohamed Taha Siala (2016–2021)
  - Béatrice Atallah (2015–2017)
  -
George Chaponda (2014–2016)
Francis Kasaila (2016–2017)
  - Abdoulaye Diop (2014–2017)
  -
 Hamadi Ould Meimou (2015–2016)
 Isselkou Ould Ahmed Izid Bih (2016–2018)
  -
 Étienne Sinatambou (2014–2016)
 Vishnu Lutchmeenaraidoo (2016–2019)
  - Salaheddine Mezouar (2013–2017)
  - Oldemiro Balói (2008–2017)
  - Netumbo Nandi-Ndaitwah (2012–present)
  -
 Aïchatou Boulama Kané (2015–2016)
 Ibrahim Yacouba (2016–2018)
  - Geoffrey Onyeama (2015–present)
  - Louise Mushikiwabo (2009–2018)
  -
Manuel Salvador dos Ramos (2014–2016)
Urbino Botelho (2016–2018)
  - Mankeur Ndiaye (2012–2017)
  -
Joel Morgan (2015–2016)
Danny Faure (2016–2018)
  - Samura Kamara (2012–2017)
  - Abdisalam Omer (2015–2017)
  - 
 Mohamed Yonis (2013-2015)
 Saad Ali Shire (2015–2018)
  - Maite Nkoana-Mashabane (2009–2018)
  -
 Barnaba Marial Benjamin (2013–2016)
 Bashir Gbandi (acting) (2016)
 Deng Alor (2016–2018)
  - Ibrahim Ghandour (2015–2018)
  – Mgwagwa Gamedze (2013–2018)
  - Augustine Mahiga (2015–2019)
  - Robert Dussey (2013–present)
  - 
Taïeb Baccouche (2015–2016)
Khemaies Jhinaoui (2016–2019)
  - Sam Kutesa (2005–2021)
  - Mohamed Salem Ould Salek (1998–2023)
  - Harry Kalaba (2014–2018)
  - Simbarashe Mumbengegwi (2005–2017)

Asia
  -
Viacheslav Chirikba (2011–2016)
Daur Kove (2016–2021)
  - Salahuddin Rabbani (2015–2019)
  - Eduard Nalbandyan (2008–2018)
  - Elmar Mammadyarov (2004–2020)
  - Sheikh Khalid ibn Ahmad Al Khalifah (2005–2020)
  - Abul Hassan Mahmud Ali (2014–2019)
  - Damcho Dorji (2015-2018)
  - Hassanal Bolkiah (2015–present)
  -
Hor Namhong (1998–2016)
Prak Sokhon (2016–present)
  - Wang Yi (2013–present)
  - Hernâni Coelho (2015–2017)
  - Mikheil Janelidze (2015–2018)
  - Sushma Swaraj (2014–2019)
  - Retno Marsudi (2014–present)
  - Mohammad Javad Zarif (2013–2021)
  - Ibrahim al-Jaafari (2014–2018)
  - Falah Mustafa Bakir (2006–2019)
  - Benjamin Netanyahu (2015–2019)
  - Fumio Kishida (2012–2017)
  - Nasser Judeh (2009–2017)
  –
 Erlan Idrissov (2012–2016)
 Kairat Abdrakhmanov (2016–2018)
  -
Ri Su-yong (2014–2016)
Ri Yong-ho (2016–2020)
  - Yun Byung-se (2013–2017)
  - Sheikh Sabah Al-Khalid Al-Sabah (2011–2019)
  - Erlan Abdyldayev (2012–2018)
  -
Thongloun Sisoulith (2006–2016)
Saleumxay Kommasith (2016–present)
  - Gebran Bassil (2014–2020)
  - Anifah Aman (2009–2018)
  -
 Dunya Maumoon (2013–2016)
 Mohamed Asim (2016–2018)
  -
 Lundeg Purevsuren (2014–2016)
 Tsend Munkh-Orgil (2016–2017)
  -
 Wunna Maung Lwin (2011–2016)
 Aung San Suu Kyi (2016–2021)
  - Karen Mirzoyan (2012–2017)
  -
Kamal Thapa (2015–2016)
Prakash Sharan Mahat (2016–2017)
  - Yusuf bin Alawi bin Abdullah (1982–2020)
  - Sartaj Aziz (2013–2017) 
  - Riyad al-Maliki (2007–present)
  -
Albert del Rosario (2011–2016)
Jose Rene Almendras (2016)
Perfecto Yasay, Jr. (2016–2017)
  - 
Khalid bin Mohammad Al Attiyah (2013–2016)
Sheikh Mohammed bin Abdulrahman Al Thani (2016–present)

  - Adel al-Jubeir (2015–2018)
  - Vivian Balakrishnan (2015–present)
  -
Kazbulat Tskhovrebov (2015-2016)
Andreï Tskhovrebov (acting) (2016)
Murat Dzhoiev (2016–2017)
  - Mangala Samaraweera (2015–2017)
  - Walid Muallem (2006–2020)
  -
David Lin (2012–2016)
David Lee (2016–2018)
  - Sirodjidin Aslov (2013–present)
  - Don Pramudwinai (2015–present)
  - Mevlüt Çavuşoğlu (2015–present)
  - Raşit Meredow (2001–present)
  - Sheikh Abdullah bin Zayed Al Nahyan (2006–present)
  - Abdulaziz Komilov (2012–present)
  - Phạm Bình Minh (2011–2021)
Yemen
 - Abdulmalik Al-Mekhlafi (2015–2018)
  Supreme Revolutionary Committee of Yemen to 14 August 2016 then Supreme Political Council (unrecognised, rival government) - 
vacant (2015–2016)
Abu Bakr al-Qirbi (2016)
Hisham Abdullah (2016-present)

Europe
  - Ditmir Bushati (2013–2019)
  - Gilbert Saboya Sunyé (2011–2017)
  - Sebastian Kurz (2013–2017)
  - Vladimir Makei (2012–present)
  - Didier Reynders (2011–2019)
  - Guy Vanhengel (2013–2019)
  - Geert Bourgeois (2014–2019)
  - Paul Magnette (2014–2017)
  - Igor Crnadak (2015–2019)
  - Daniel Mitov (2014–2017)
 
Vesna Pusić (2011–2016)
Miro Kovač (2016)
Davor Ivo Stier (2016–2017)
  - Ioannis Kasoulidis (2013-2018)
  - Lubomír Zaorálek (2014–2017)
  -
Kristian Jensen (2015–2016)
Anders Samuelsen (2016–2019)
  - Poul Michelsen (2015–2019)
  Donetsk People's Republic -
Alexander Kofman (2014–2016)
Natalya Nikonorova (acting) (2016–present)
  -
 Marina Kaljurand (2015–2016)
 Jürgen Ligi (2016)
 Sven Mikser (2016–2019)
  - Timo Soini (2015–2019)
  -
Laurent Fabius (2012–2016)
Jean-Marc Ayrault (2016–2017)
  - Frank-Walter Steinmeier (2013–2017)
  - Nikos Kotzias (2015–2018)
  - Jonathan Le Tocq (2016–present)
  - Péter Szijjártó (2014–present)
  -
Gunnar Bragi Sveinsson (2013–2016)
Lilja Dögg Alfreðsdóttir (2016–2017)
  - Charles Flanagan (2014–2017)
  -
 Paolo Gentiloni (2014–2016)
 Angelino Alfano (2016–2018)
  - Sir Philip Bailhache (2013–2018)
  -
Hashim Thaçi (2014–2016)
Petrit Selimi (acting) (2016)
Enver Hoxhaj (2016–2017)
  - Edgars Rinkēvičs (2011–present)
  - Aurelia Frick (2009–2019)
  - Linas Antanas Linkevičius (2012–2020)
  - Jean Asselborn (2004–present)
  - Nikola Poposki (2011–2017)
  - George Vella (2013–2017)
  -
Natalia Gherman (2013–2016)
Andrei Galbur (2016–2018)
  Gagauzia - Vitaliy Vlah (2015–present)
  - Gilles Tonelli (2015–2019)
  -
Igor Lukšić (2012–2016)
Milo Đukanović (acting) (2016)
Srđan Darmanović (2016–2020)
  - Bert Koenders (2014–2017)
  -
Emine Çolak (2015–2016)
Tahsin Ertuğruloğlu (2016–2018)
  - Børge Brende (2013–2017)
  - Witold Waszczykowski (2015–2018)
  - Augusto Santos Silva (2015–2022)
  - Lazăr Comănescu (2015–2017)
  - Sergey Lavrov (2004–present)
  -
 Pasquale Valentini (2012–2016)
 Nicola Renzi (2016–2020)
  - Ivica Dačić (2014–2020)
  - Miroslav Lajčák (2012–2020)
  - Karl Erjavec (2012–2018)
  -
José Manuel García-Margallo (2011–2016)
Alfonso Dastis (2016–2018)
  Catalonia -
Francesc Homs Molist (2012–2016)
Raül Romeva (2016–2017)
  - Margot Wallström (2014–2019)
  - Didier Burkhalter (2012–2017)
  - Vitaly Ignatyev (acting from 2016) (2015–present)

  - Pavlo Klimkin (2014–2019)
  -
Philip Hammond (2014–2016)
Boris Johnson (2016–2018)
  Scotland - Fiona Hyslop (2009–2020)
  - Archbishop Paul Gallagher (2014–present)

North America and the Caribbean
  - Charles Fernandez (2014–2018)
  - Fred Mitchell (2012–2017)
  - Maxine McClean (2008–2018)
  - Wilfred Elrington (2008–2020)
  - Stéphane Dion (2015–2017)
  Quebec - Christine St-Pierre (2014–2018)
  - Manuel González Sanz (2014–2018)
  - Bruno Rodríguez Parrilla (2009–present)
  - Francine Baron (2014–2019)
  -
Andrés Navarro (2014–2016)
Miguel Vargas Maldonado (2016–2020)
  - Hugo Martínez (2014–2018)
  Greenland - Vittus Qujaukitsoq (2014–2017)
  -
 Clarice Modeste-Curwen (2014–2016)
 Elvin Nimrod (2016–2018)
  - Carlos Raúl Morales (2014–2017)
  -
Lener Renauld (acting) (2015–2016)
Pierrot Delienne (2016–2017)
  -
 Arturo Corrales (2015–2016)
 María Dolores Agüero (acting) (2016–2019)
  -
Arnold Nicholson (2012–2016)
Kamina Johnson Smith (2016–present)
  - Claudia Ruiz Massieu (2015–2017)
  - Samuel Santos López (2007–2017)
  - Isabel Saint Malo (2014–2019)
  – Víctor Suárez Meléndez (2015–2017)
  - Mark Brantley (2015–present)
  -
Alva Baptiste (2011–2016)
Allen Chastanet (2016–2021)
  - Sir Louis Straker (2015–2020)
  - Dennis Moses (2015–2020)
  - John Kerry (2013–2017)

Oceania
  - Julie Bishop (2013–2018)
  - Henry Puna (2013–2020)
  -
Ratu Inoke Kubuabola (2009–2016)
Frank Bainimarama (2016–2019)
   - Édouard Fritch (2014–present)
  -
 Anote Tong (2003–2016)
 Taneti Mamau (2016–present)
  -
 Tony deBrum (2014–2016)
 Kessai Note (2016)
 John Silk (2016–2020)
  - Lorin S. Robert (2007–2019)
  - Baron Waqa (2013–2019)
  - Murray McCully (2008–2017)
  - Toke Talagi (2008–2020)
  - Billy Kuartei (2013–2017)
  - Rimbink Pato (2012–2019)
  - Tuilaepa Aiono Sailele Malielegaoi (1998–2021)
  - Milner Tozaka (2014–2019)
  -
Siopili Perez (2015–2016)
 Afega Gaualofa (2016–2017)
  - ʻAkilisi Pōhiva (2014–2017)
  - Taukelina Finikaso (2013–2019)
  -
Havo Moli (2015–2016)
Bruno Leingkone (2016-2016)

South America
  - Susana Malcorra (2015–2017)
  - David Choquehuanca (2006–2017)
  - 
Mauro Vieira (2015–2016)
José Serra (2016–2017)
  - Heraldo Muñoz (2014–2018)
  - María Ángela Holguín (2010–2018)
  -
Ricardo Patiño (2010–2016)
Guillaume Long (2016–2017)
  - Carl Greenidge (2015–2019)
  - Eladio Loizaga (2013–2018)
  -
 Ana María Sánchez (2015–2016)
 Ricardo Luna (2016–2018)
  - Niermala Badrising (2015–2017)
  - Rodolfo Nin Novoa (2015–2020)
  - Delcy Rodríguez (2014–2017)

References

Foreign ministers
2016 in international relations

Foreign ministers
2016